Melinopterus consputus is a species of scarab beetle in the family Scarabaeidae, found in the Palearctic. The species is considered endangered in Germany.

References

External links

 

Scarabaeidae
Palearctic insects
Beetles of North Africa
Beetles of Asia
Beetles of Europe
Beetles described in 1799